Joan Holderness (March 17, 1933 - July 6, 2017) was an American member of the All-American Girls Professional Baseball League from 1949 to 1951.

Early life 
Joan was born in Kenosha, Wisconsin.  Both her father and grandfather played a lot of ball.  So she played with them.  She had a bat and a ball and they had flat gloves and she remembers playing as a child.  She first heard about the league when her mother took her to a ball game when she was in 5th or 6th grade for the Kenosha Comets.  She loved it and immediately wished to play for the team. Her mother was strictly against this, and she refused to go to any more of the games.  Holderness eventually began watching them practice, and met several ball players, who would play catch with her.

In 1947, at the age of 14, she was asked if she wanted to be Kenosha's batgirl.  She accepted, received her uniform, and became the batgirl during the summer.  A year later, the AAGPBL began using farm teams, and Holderness was given permission to play once a week. She played shortstop for that year, and moved up to the highest level of the league the next year.

Career 
In 1949, Joan was invited to go to Spring training in Indiana. It was there she got a contract which her father signed as she was only 16 (under age).  But her mom wouldn't let her travel so half the year she didn't do much.  But she was very well-liked and by 1950, she played more, sometimes right-field.  She had a good arm and was asked to join the Grand Rapid Chicks which was in town playing against Kenosha.

Throughout her baseball career, Joan played for the Kenosha Comets (1949-1950), the Grand Rapids Chicks (1950-1951), and the Battle Creek Belles (1951). She was a versatile player, playing outfield, shortstop, and utility infield.

After baseball 
Following her time with the league, Joan's hobbies included fishing and bowling.  In 1963, she joined the National Ladies Professional Bowling Association.  In 1981, she was inducted into the Florida Women's Bowling Association Hall of Fame.  A year later, she was inducted into the St. Petersburg, Florida Women's Hall of Fame and 2 years later, the Clearwater, Florida Women's Hall of Fame. Holderness died on July 6, 2017, in Crossville, TN.

Career statistics

References

External links 

1933 births
2017 deaths
All-American Girls Professional Baseball League players
Kenosha Comets players
Grand Rapids Chicks players
Battle Creek Belles players
Baseball players from Wisconsin
American female baseball players
21st-century American women
Sportspeople from Kenosha, Wisconsin